E96 may refer to:
 European route E96
 The E96 series of preferred numbers
 E96 cluster bomb
 King's Indian Defense, orthodox variation, Encyclopaedia of Chess Openings code
 Nagasaki Bypass, route E96 in Japan